Frederik Bouttats may refer to:

Frederik Bouttats the Elder (1590–1661), Flemish engraver
Frederik Bouttats the Younger (1620–1676), Flemish engraver